Raghava (Sanskrit rāghava "descendant of Raghu") may be
a name of Rama as mythological king of Kosala

in the dual, Rama and Lakshmana
Raghava Rama, the name of a Vaishna mantra associated with Sri Caitanya Mahaprabhu
 Raghava Iyengar (1878–1960), was a well known Tamil scholar
 Pendyal Raghava Rao (born 1917), was an Indian Parliamentarian
 Raghava Lawrence (born 1971), Indian choreographer who has also appeared in films as an actor, director, composer and playback singer
 Raghava Reddy, philanthropist & businessman from Kurnool, Andhra Pradesh, India

Indian given names

pl:Raghawa